San Marcos High School may refer to:

 San Marcos High School (San Marcos, California)
 San Marcos High School (Santa Barbara, California)
 San Marcos High School (Texas)